The 2005–06 Scottish League Cup was the 60th staging of the Scotland's second most prestigious football knockout competition, also known for sponsorship reasons as the CIS Insurance Cup.

The competition was won by Celtic, who defeated Dunfermline Athletic 3–0 in the final.

First round

Second round

Third round

Quarter-finals

Semi-finals

Final

Scottish League Cup seasons
League Cup